USS Tamarack (SP-561) was a United States Navy patrol vessel in commission from 1917 to 1919.

Tamarack was built as a private motor yacht of the same name by Nevins Shipyard at City Island in the Bronx, New York, in 1915 to a design by the firm of Swasey, Raymond, and Page.  On 25 June 1917, the U.S. Navy acquired her under a free lease from her owner, Leonard Breed of Flushing, New York, for use as a section patrol craft during World War I. She was commissioned as USS Tamarack (SP-561) on 18 September 1917.

Assigned to the 3rd Naval District, Tamarack served on patrol duties along the coasts of Connecticut, New York, and New Jersey for the rest of World War I and into early 1919.

Tamarack was returned to Beard on 21 February 1919 and stricken from the Navy List the same day. She returned to civilian service, and later was renamed Elmarlu.

Notes

References

NavSource Online: Section Patrol Craft Photo Archive: Tamarack (SP 561)

Patrol vessels of the United States Navy
World War I patrol vessels of the United States
Ships built in City Island, Bronx
1915 ships
Individual yachts